Papias was a Greek Apostolic Father, Bishop of Hierapolis (modern Pamukkale, Turkey), and author who lived c. 60 – c. 130 AD. He wrote the Exposition of the Sayings of the Lord in five books.
This work, which is lost apart from brief excerpts in the works of Irenaeus of Lyons and Eusebius of Caesarea, is an important early source on Christian oral tradition and especially on the origins of the canonical Gospels.

Life

Very little is known of Papias apart from what can be inferred from his own writings. He is described as "an ancient man who was a hearer of John and a companion of Polycarp" by Polycarp's disciple Irenaeus (c. 180).

Eusebius adds that Papias was Bishop of Hierapolis around the time of Ignatius of Antioch. In this office Papias was presumably succeeded by Abercius of Hierapolis.

The name Papias was very common in the region, suggesting that he was probably a native of the area.

Date

The work of Papias is dated by a few modern scholars to about 95–110. Later dates were once argued from two references that now appear to be mistaken. One dating Papias' death to around the death of Polycarp in 164 is actually a mistake for Papylas. Another unreliable source in which Papias is said to refer to the reign of Hadrian (117–138) seems to have resulted from confusion between Papias and Quadratus of Athens.

Eusebius refers to Papias only in his third book, and thus seems to date him before the opening of his fourth book in 109. Papias himself knows several New Testament books, whose dates are themselves controversial, and was informed by John the Evangelist, Aristion, the daughters of Philip and others who had themselves heard the Twelve Apostles. He is also called a companion of the long-lived Polycarp (69–155), Agapius of Hierapolis dates one of his histories to the 12th year of Trajan's rule (110 AD). For all these reasons, Papias is thought to have written around the turn of the 2nd century.

Sources

Papias describes his way of gathering information in his preface:

Papias, then, inquired of travelers passing through Hierapolis what the surviving disciples of Jesus and the elders—those who had personally known the Twelve Apostles—were saying. One of these disciples was Aristion, probably bishop of nearby Smyrna, and another was John the Elder, usually identified (despite Eusebius' protest) with John the Evangelist, residing in nearby Ephesus, of whom Papias was a hearer; Papias frequently cited both. From the daughters of Philip, who settled in Hierapolis, Papias learned still other traditions.

There is some debate about the intention of Papias' last sentence in the above quotation, "For I did not think that information from the books would profit me as much as information from a living and surviving voice." One side of the debate holds, with the longstanding opinion of 20th-century scholarship, that in Papias' day written statements were held at a lower value than oral statements. The other side observes that "living voice" was a topos, an established phrase referring to personal instruction and apprenticeship, and thus Papias indicates his preference for personal instruction over isolated book learning.

Fragments

Despite indications that the work of Papias was still extant in the late Middle Ages, the full text is now lost. Extracts, however, appear in a number of other writings, some of which cite a book number. MacDonald proposes the following tentative reconstruction of the five books, following a presumed Matthaean order.

Gospel origins 

Papias provides the earliest extant account of who wrote the Gospels. Eusebius preserves two (possibly) verbatim excerpts from Papias on the origins of the Gospels, one concerning Mark and then another concerning Matthew.

On Mark, Papias cites John the Elder:

The excerpt regarding Matthew says only:

How to interpret these quotations from Papias has long been a matter of controversy, as the original context for each is missing and the Greek is in several respects ambiguous and seems to employ technical rhetorical terminology. For one thing, it is not even explicit that the writings by Mark and Matthew are the canonical Gospels bearing those names.

The word logia—which also appears in the title of Papias' work—is itself problematic. In non-Christian contexts, the usual meaning was oracles, but since the 19th century it has been interpreted as sayings, which sparked numerous theories about a lost "Sayings Gospel", now called Q, resembling the Gospel of Thomas. But the parallelism implies a meaning of things said or done, which suits the canonical Gospels well.

The apparent claim that Matthew wrote in Hebrew—which in Greek could refer to either Hebrew or Aramaic—is echoed by many other ancient authorities. Modern scholars have proposed numerous explanations for this assertion, in light of the prevalent view that canonical Matthew was composed in Greek and not translated from Semitic. One theory is that Matthew himself produced firstly a Semitic work and secondly a recension of that work in Greek. Another is that others translated Matthew into Greek rather freely. Another is that Papias simply means "Ἑβραίδι διαλέκτῳ" as a Hebrew style of Greek. Another is that Papias refers to a distinct work now lost, perhaps a sayings collection like Q or the so-called Gospel according to the Hebrews. Yet another is that Papias was simply mistaken.

As for Mark, the difficulty has been in understanding the relationship described between Mark and Peter—whether Peter recalled from memory or Mark recalled Peter's preaching, and whether Mark translated this preaching into Greek or Latin or merely expounded on it, and if the former, publicly or just when composing the Gospel; modern scholars have explored a range of possibilities. Eusebius, after quoting Papias, goes on to say that Papias also cited 1 Peter, where Peter speaks of "my son Mark", as corroboration. Within the 2nd century, this relation of Peter to Mark's Gospel is alluded to by Justin and expanded on by Clement of Alexandria.

We do not know what else Papias said about these or the other Gospels—he certainly treated John—but some see Papias as the likely unattributed source of at least two later accounts of the Gospel origins. Bauckham argues that the Muratorian Canon (c. 170) has drawn from Papias; the extant fragment, however, preserves only a few final words on Mark and then speaks about Luke and John. Hill argues that Eusebius' earlier account of the origins of the four Gospels is also drawn from Papias.

Eschatological

Eusebius concludes from the writings of Papias that he was a chiliast, understanding the Millennium as a literal period in which Christ will reign on Earth, and chastises Papias for his literal interpretation of figurative passages, writing that Papias "appears to have been of very limited understanding", and felt that his misunderstanding misled Irenaeus and others.

Irenaeus indeed quotes the fourth book of Papias for an otherwise-unknown saying of Jesus, recounted by John the Evangelist, which Eusebius doubtless has in mind:

Parallels have often been noted between this account and Jewish texts of the period such as 2 Baruch.

On the other hand, Papias is elsewhere said to have understood mystically the Hexaemeron (six days of Creation) as referring to Christ and the Church.

Pericope Adulterae

Eusebius concludes his account of Papias by saying that he relates "another account about a woman who was accused of many sins before the Lord, which is found in the Gospel according to the Hebrews". Agapius of Hierapolis (10th century) offers a fuller summary of what Papias said here, calling the woman an adulteress. The parallel is clear to the famous Pericope Adulterae, a problematic passage absent or relocated in many ancient Gospel manuscripts. The remarkable fact is that the story is known in some form to such an ancient witness as Papias.

What is less clear is to what extent Eusebius and Agapius are reporting the words of Papias versus the form of the pericope known to them from elsewhere. A wide range of versions have come down to us, in fact. Since the passage in John is virtually unknown to the Greek patristic tradition; Eusebius has cited the only parallel he recognized, from the now-lost Gospel according to the Hebrews, which may be the version quoted by Didymus the Blind.

The nearest agreement with "many sins" actually occurs in the Johannine text of Armenian codex Matenadaran 2374 (formerly Ečmiadzin 229); this codex is also remarkable for ascribing the longer ending of Mark to "Ariston the Elder", which is often seen as somehow connected with Papias.

Death of Judas

According to a scholium attributed to Apollinaris of Laodicea, Papias also related a tale on the grotesque fate of Judas Iscariot:

Death of John

Two late sources (Philip of Side and George Hamartolus) cite the second book of Papias as recording that John and his brother James were killed by the Jews. However, some modern scholars doubt the reliability of the two sources regarding Papias, while others argue that Papias did speak of John's martyrdom. According to the two sources, Papias presented this as fulfillment of the prophecy of Jesus on the martyrdom of these two brothers. This is consistent with a tradition attested in several ancient martyrologies.

Barsabbas

Papias relates, on the authority of the daughters of Philip, an event concerning Justus Barsabbas, who according to Acts was one of two candidates proposed to join the Twelve Apostles. The summary in Eusebius tells us that he "drank a deadly poison and suffered no harm," while Philip of Side recounts that he "drank snake venom in the name of Christ when put to the test by unbelievers and was protected from all harm." The account about Justus Barsabbas is followed by a one about the resurrection of the mother of a certain Manaem. This account may be connected to a verse from the longer ending of Mark: "They will pick up snakes in their hands, and if they drink any deadly thing, it will not hurt them."

Reliability

Eusebius had a "low esteem of Papias' intellect". Eusebius, despite his own views on Papias, knew that Irenaeus believed Papias to be a reliable witness to original apostolic traditions.

We should be hesitant to take much from Eusebius' comment about Papias' intellect though. Eusebius’ use of sources suggests that he himself did not always exercise the soundest of critical judgement, and his negative assessment of Papias was in all likelihood dictated simply by a distrust of chiliasm.

Modern scholars have debated Papias' reliability. Much discussion of Papias's comments about the Gospel of Mark and Gospel of Matthew is concerned with either showing their reliability as evidence for the origins of these Gospels or with emphasizing their apologetic character in order to discredit their reliability. Yoon-Man Park cites a modern argument that Papias's tradition was formulated to vindicate the apostolicity of Mark's Gospel, but dismisses this as an unlikely apologetic route unless the Peter-Mark connection Papias described had already been accepted with general agreement by the early church. Maurice Casey argued that Papias was indeed reliable about a Hebrew collection of sayings by Matthew the Apostle, which he argues was independent of the Greek Gospel of Matthew, possibly written by another Matthew or Matthias in the early church.

Others argue Papias faithfully recorded what was related to him, but misunderstood the subjects of narrations he was unfamiliar with.

See also
 Q+/Papias hypothesis

Notes

References

Bibliography

 
  (with the annotated English translation of the fragments, pp. 105–260).

External links
Chronicon.net – Complete Fragments of Papias with new discoveries listed
Biblical Audio – 2012 Papias translation and audio version (based on Chronicon.net fragments)
Christian Classics Etheral Library – Fragments of Papias
Early Christian Writings – Fragments of Papias
Patristics In English Project – Fragments of Papias

 (including an explanation of why logia is not to be rendered as "sayings", but as "oracles")
 

2nd-century bishops in Roman Anatolia
Church Fathers
Saints from Roman Anatolia
2nd-century Christian saints
2nd-century Christian theologians
Lost religious texts
Writers of lost works